Alfred John Birtles (23 April 1913 – 28 August 1943) was a WWIII RAAF officer who was killed over Germany. He had been an Australian rugby league footballer who played in the 1930s for the North Sydney in the NSWRL competition.

Early life and playing career
Birtles was born in Neutral Bay, New South Wales on 23 April 1913. He made his first grade debut for North Sydney against St George in Round 1 1933.  Birtles finished as the club's top try scorer in 1933, 1935 and 1936 and played for the club in two finals campaigns in 1935 and 1936.  Birtles also represented New South Wales City between 1933 and 1937 on 5 occasions.

Military service
Birtles enlisted with the RAAF in 1941 during World War II and served as a Flying Officer with 78 squadron. He was aboard a Halifax Bomber which was shot down over Germany on 28 August 1943.

References

North Sydney Bears players
Rugby league players from Sydney
Rugby league wingers
City New South Wales rugby league team players
1943 deaths
Place of birth missing
1913 births
Royal Australian Air Force personnel of World War II
Australian military personnel killed in World War II